Kideo TV was a syndicated anthology packaging by DIC Enterprises and LBS Communications, which premiered in April 1986. The show's name is a portmanteau of "kid" and "video".

Hosts
The show was hosted by four youths in auto racing attire with chassis on their shoulders.  They included a boy, 4U (Mark Hennessy) and a girl, Euphoria, who were the "good kids" of the show, and they taught lessons to the reckless Fast Lane, a fiery-haired teen with a flame-decorated chassis on his shoulders and the chubby, impressionable Couch Potato. These sketches were under five minutes in length, and their lessons were restated by Bob Keeshan, and the youths also did commercial bumpers. While this material was originally credited, no resources have made note of who was involved, and it is omitted from rerun packages.

Cartoons
Each 90-minute show contained three half-hour cartoons from the DIC catalogue.
 The Get Along Gang (September 1986 – 1987)
 Lady Lovelylocks and the Pixietails (April 1987 – 1987)
 Popples (April 1986 – 1987)
 Rainbow Brite (April 1986-April 1987)
 Ulysses 31 (April–September 1986)

References

External links
 IMDb

 
1980s American animated television series
1980s American anthology television series
1986 American television series debuts
1987 American television series endings
American children's animated anthology television series
English-language television shows
First-run syndicated television programs in the United States
Television series by DIC Entertainment
Television series by DHX Media